Weaver Peninsula is a small peninsula between Collins Harbor and Marian Cove, Maxwell Bay, King George Island, terminating in North Spit. Named by the United Kingdom Antarctic Place-Names Committee (UK-APC) in 1977 after Stephen D. Weaver, geologist, University of Birmingham, with the British Antarctic Survey (BAS) party in this area in 1975.

Peninsulas of Antarctica